Big Creek (Big Creek Flats in the 1870s; Manzanita Park in 1902; until 1926, Cascada) is a small census-designated place in Fresno County, California, located in the Sierra Nevada on the north bank of Big Creek. Its last population count was 175. The ZIP code is 93605, and the community is inside area code 559.

History

Big Creek was built at the site of the first dam and power plant of Southern California Edison's Big Creek Hydroelectric Project, one of the most extensive in the world. Other than the private helipad owned by Southern California Edison, the only way in or out of the town is Big Creek Road, off of State Route 168. The dam has a walkway across it to the south bank, but access is limited to employees of SCE and those residents who have been given a key. Its major industries are electric power generation and tourism. There is camping and water recreation in the summer and snow skiing in the winter. Huntington Lake is to the northeast and Shaver Lake is to the south. Though Big Creek's only school is an elementary, it teaches kindergarten through 8th grade.

The penstock pipes for the original two units at Big Creek Power Houses One and Two, built 1912–13, were purchased from the Krupp Works in Germany because at that time that manufacturer produced steel pipes of the tensile strength needed to contain the very high water pressures in the pipes in the  drop down to Power House One. All post-World War One penstock pipes were manufactured in the United States.

The first post office opened at Big Creek in 1912.

Half the town's homes were destroyed by the 2020 Creek Fire.

Demographics

The 2010 United States Census reported that Big Creek had a population of 175. The racial makeup of Big Creek was 158 (90.3%) White, 1 (0.6%) African American, 1 (0.6%) Native American, 5 (2.9%) Asian, 0 (0.0%) Pacific Islander, 3 (1.7%) from other races, and 7 (4.0%) from two or more races. Hispanic or Latino of any race were 27 persons (15.4%).

The Census reported that 175 people (100% of the population) lived in households, 0 (0%) lived in non-institutionalized group quarters, and 0 (0%) were institutionalized.

There were 63 households, out of which 26 (41.3%) had children under the age of 18 living in them, 43 (68.3%) were opposite-sex married couples living together, 1 (1.6%) had a female householder with no husband present, 3 (4.8%) had a male householder with no wife present.  There were 4 (6.3%) unmarried opposite-sex partnerships, and 2 (3.2%) same-sex married couples or partnerships. 12 households (19.0%) were made up of individuals, and 2 (3.2%) had someone living alone who was 65 years of age or older. The average household size was 2.78.  There were 47 families (74.6% of all households); the average family size was 3.21.

The population was spread out, with 60 people (34.3%) under the age of 18, 4 people (2.3%) aged 18 to 24, 37 people (21.1%) aged 25 to 44, 58 people (33.1%) aged 45 to 64, and 16 people (9.1%) who were 65 years of age or older.  The median age was 37.6 years. For every 100 females, there were 86.2 males.  For every 100 females age 18 and over, there were 109.1 males.

The homeowner vacancy rate was 0%; the rental vacancy rate was 31.1%.  47 people (26.9% of the population) lived in owner-occupied housing units and 128 people (73.1%) lived in rental housing units.

References

External links
 Big Creek Demographics
 The Big Creek Project

See also
San Joaquin and Eastern Railroad

Census-designated places in Fresno County, California
Populated places established in 1912
1912 establishments in California
Census-designated places in California